The 2011 Hangzhou Greentown F.C. season involved Hangzhou competing in the Chinese Super League, Chinese FA Cup, and AFC Champions League. Hangzhou qualified for the AFC Champions League after finishing 4th place in the 2010 Chinese Super League.

Players

Competitions

Chinese Super League

Chinese FA Cup

AFC Champions League

References

Zhejiang Professional F.C. seasons
Hangzhou Greentown F.C.